CKRH-FM is a Canadian radio station, broadcasting at 98.5 MHz in Halifax, Nova Scotia. The station broadcasts a French language community radio format for the city's Acadian and francophone communities. CKRH's studios are located at 5527 Cogswell Street in Halifax, which is rented to the station by Evanov Radio Group, and its transmitter is located on Washmill Lake Drive in Clayton Park.

Owned by Coopérative Radio-Halifax-Métro limitée, the station received CRTC approval in 2006.

The station is a member of the Alliance des radios communautaires du Canada.

References

External links
 CKRH
 CKRH-FM history - Canadian Communication Foundation
 

KRH
KRH
KRH
Radio stations established in 2006
2006 establishments in Nova Scotia